The 1963 Tour de Hongrie was the 19th edition of the Tour de Hongrie cycle race and was held from 17 to 22 June 1963. The race started and finished in Szombathely. The race was won by András Mészáros.

General classification

References

1963
Tour de Hongrie
Tour de Hongrie